Lana is a comune (municipality) in South Tyrol in northern Italy. It is situated in the Etschtal (Etsch Valley) between Bolzano and Merano and at the entrance to the Ultental. The population rose to 12,566 in 2020. 

It is one of the three municipalities of South Tyrol whose name remained unchanged by the early 20th-century renaming programme which aimed at replacing mostly German place names with Italianised versions, the other two being Gais and Plaus.

History

Coat-of-arms 
The emblem displays argent, a Teutonic cross sable, and a lion rampant gules over all. The lion is taken from the arms of the Counts of Brandis who played a role in the development of the village. The emblem was adopted in 1967.

Society

Linguistic distribution 
According to the 2011 census, 91.84% of Lana's population speak German, 7.90% Italian, and 0.26% Ladin as first language.

Demographic evolution

Notable people 
 Father Joseph Ohrwalder (1856 in Lana - 1913 in Sudan) a Roman Catholic priest, who was taken captive by the Mahdists in Sudan
 Robert Schälzky (1882 – 1948) was the 61st Grand Master of the Teutonic Order 1936 to 1948; he died in Lana
 Hans Andersag (1902-1955) a scientist who discovered chloroquine  
 Karl Zuegg (1914 – 2005) an Italian entrepreneur, MD of the Lana fruit juice and jam company Zuegg, between 1940 and 1986
 Armin Zöggeler (born 1974) a retired Italian luger and double Olympic champion, he lives in Lana

Economy

Tourism 
Lana is a village which is divided into three parts: Oberlana, Mitterlana and Niederlana. It is a popular tourist spot offering sports such as tennis, football, golf, minigolf and ice-skating among others. During summer, locals and tourists alike enjoy swimming, hiking and cycling because there are a lot of good cycle paths.

References

External links

  Homepage of the municipality

Municipalities of South Tyrol
Nonsberg Group